Big Koniuji Island ( or Kunujutanany) is an island located in the Aleutians East Borough, Gulf of Alaska, southwest of mainland Alaska, United States. It is part of the Shumagin Islands, which consist of 20 islands, and lies southeast of Popof Island.

History 
The island's Aleut name Kiuniuiu Tanani (or Kunujutanany) means Big Crested Auk. It first appeared on the US Coast & Geodetic Survey charts in 1872.

A man named Oscar Olsen, who was a resident of Unga Island, introduced 13 pairs of red foxes from the Alaska Peninsula to the island in 1916. He originally planned to release an additional 17 pairs the following year. Additionally in 1925, arctic foxes were brought to the island but were quickly eradicated by the more dominant red foxes. The presence of foxes on the island, led to a flourishing fox trapping business which resulted in the construction of five cabins on the island. These cabins were constructed along the bays of Fox Farmers Cove, Long Bay, Alaska Harbor, Stormy Cove and Sandpiper Lagoon, with the main camp being located in Stormy Cove as it was the safest place to reach when arriving by small boat from Sand Point, Alaska. Yukon Harbor saw an additional cabin being constructed by 1935.

In 1986, the US Fish and Wildlife Service exterminated the red foxes from the island. They used traps, snares and rifles to clear the island of foxes as to restore the breeding spots of seabirds. Following the trapping of 84 foxes over a period of 3 months in 1985 and 1986, the island was declared fox-free in 1987 and a gull colony was quickly formed on the island.

Geography 
It lies at these coordinates:  and has a size of 93 Square kilometre. The island lies Southeast of Popof Island, where the closest city Sand Point is also located. The island is part of the Northeast Aleutian Range.

Climate

See also 
 List of islands of Alaska

References 

Shumagin Islands
Aleutian Range
Islands of Alaska
Islands of the United States
Islands of Aleutians East Borough, Alaska